Claudio Gentile (born 27 September 1953) is an Italian football manager and former player who played as a defender in the 1970s and 1980s.

Gentile appeared for Italy in two World Cup tournaments, and played for the winning Italian team in the 1982 final. His club career was notably spent with Juventus for whom he made almost 300 league appearances, winning six national titles and two major European trophies.

Club career
He was born in Tripoli, Libya, but came to Italy as a child.
After beginning his career with Arona, Gentile played in Serie B with Varese during the 1972–73 season.

He then moved to Juventus and first played for them in a Coppa Italia match against Ascoli Calcio on 29 August 1973, with his Serie A debut following on 2 December 1973 against Verona. In all he played 414 senior matches for Juventus, including 283 in Serie A. In over a decade with Juventus, Gentile won two major European club competitions (1976–77 UEFA Cup and 1983–84 European Cup Winners' Cup), six Serie A championships, and two Coppa Italias. He also reached the final of the 1982–83 European Cup with the Turin club, only to suffer a 1–0 defeat against Hamburg in Athens.

In 1984, he moved to rivals Fiorentina where he spent three further seasons in Serie A, making over 60 appearances for the club. He then played a final season with Piacenza, in Serie B, retiring at the end of the 1987–88 season.

International career
Gentile was capped on 71 occasions by Italy between 1975 and 1984, scoring a single goal during his international career. He played in all of Italy's matches at the 1978 World Cup, where Italy finished in fourth place, after reaching second place in the final group stage of the tournament and then losing the 3rd place playoff to Brazil. Gentile also played in the 1980 European Championship, and he was named in the team of the tournament.

In the 1982 World Cup, Gentile was once again a permanent member of the starting line-up as Italy went on to win the World Cup that year. He gained notoriety for his aggressive man-marking of Diego Maradona in a second-round victory against Argentina at the 1982 World Cup, where he fouled the Argentine star 11 times in the first half, and 23 in total, after which Gentile famously quipped, "Football is not for ballerinas!" Italy ended up defeating the defending champions Argentina 2–1. Italy then faced tournament favorites Brazil in the next second-round group match and won 3–2. Paolo Rossi had a hat trick. Italy defeated Poland 2–0 in the semi-final, and Gentile returned for the final against West Germany where Italy won 3–1. Gentile was once again in the team of the tournament for his performances during the 1982 World Cup.

Style of play
A tough, strong, tenacious, ruthless, and uncompromising defender, Gentile was regarded as one of the best defenders of his generation, one of the toughest ever players in his position, and as one of the greatest Italian defenders of all time. A hard-tackling and versatile defender, he was capable of playing both as a man-marking centre-back or "stopper", and as a full-back on either flank, and was particularly known for his tight, heavy, physical marking of opponents, as well as his work-rate, and aggressive challenges. He was also capable of playing as a sweeper, a role which he occupied towards the end of his career, as he lost some of his pace, or in the centre of the pitch as a defensive midfielder. He also stood out for his ability in the air.

Although he was not initially known to be the most naturally talented footballer from a skilful standpoint, and was seen as more of a defensive-minded right-back, who mainly sought to break down opposing attacks, he was known for his discipline in training, and showed significant technical improvements throughout his career. Indeed, he was a mobile and hard-working player, who was also capable of contributing offensively as an attacking full-back in a zonal-marking system, by getting up the flank and providing deliveries into the box for his teammates. Alongside Juventus and Italy teammates Dino Zoff, Brio, Cabrini, and Scirea, he formed one of the most formidable defensive lines in football history.

In 2007, The Times placed Gentile at number 8 in their list of the 50 hardest footballers in history. However, despite his infamous reputation, Gentile considered himself to be a hard yet fair player. He was only sent off once in his career, with Juventus, in a 2–0 away loss to Club Brugge in a European Cup semi-final match in April 1978, for a double booking following a hand ball. Due to his aggressive playing style and country of birth, Gentile was given the nickname Gaddafi in the Italian media.

Coaching career
Gentile later coached the Italy national under-21 team which won the 2004 UEFA European Under-21 Championship, and the Olympic team which won a bronze at the 2004 Olympics in Athens.

On 5 June 2014, he signed two-year deal with FC Sion.

Honours

Player
Juventus
 Serie A: 1974–75, 1976–77, 1977–78, 1980–81, 1981–82, 1983–84
Coppa Italia: 1978–79, 1982–83
 UEFA Cup Winners' Cup: 1983–84
 UEFA Cup: 1976–77
Intercontinental Cup: Runner-up: 1973
European Cup: Runner-up: 1982–83

Italy
 FIFA World Cup: 1982
 FIFA World Cup: Semi-finals: 1978
 UEFA European Football Championship: Semi-finals: 1980

Individual
UEFA European Championship Team of the Tournament: 1980
FIFA World Cup All-star Team: 1982

Coach
Italy U21
 UEFA European Under-21 Championship: 2004
Italy Olympic Team
Summer Olympic Games: Bronze Medal: 2004

References

External links
 Interview at FIFA.com

1953 births
Living people
People from Tripoli, Libya
Italian footballers
Italy international footballers
Italian football managers
FIFA World Cup-winning players
1978 FIFA World Cup players
1982 FIFA World Cup players
UEFA Euro 1980 players
Juventus F.C. players
ACF Fiorentina players
Italian beach soccer players
Serie A players
Serie B players
Serie D players
Association football defenders
Piacenza Calcio 1919 players
S.S.D. Varese Calcio players
FC Sion managers
Libyan people of Italian descent
Medalists at the 2004 Summer Olympics
Olympic bronze medalists for Italy
People of Sicilian descent
Libyan emigrants to Italy
UEFA Cup winning players

nds:Claudio Gentile